Matthew Scott Dubnik (born March 30, 1981) is an American politician who has served in the Georgia House of Representatives from the 29th district since 2017. In addition to his role in the Georgia House of Representatives, Dubnik serves as chief engagement officer of Forum Communications - a Georgia-based marketing agency. He attended Lakeview Academy, an independent school in Gainesville, Georgia and received his Bachelor of Science in management and information technology from Georgia Institute of Technology.

References

1981 births
Living people
Republican Party members of the Georgia House of Representatives
21st-century American politicians